Anglo-American University (AAU) is a private university in Prague, Czech Republic, providing courses in English. Founded in 1990, it was the first private university in the country to use English as the language of instruction.

History 
Anglo-American University was founded in 1990 as the Anglo-American College by Jansen Raichl and Vlasta Raichlová, shortly after the collapse of communism. Their aim was to create a higher education institution that would combine Central European university traditions with US and British academic principles. The college's name in English was later changed to university instead of college.

In 2010, AAU was the first university outside the United States to be invited to apply for institutional accreditation by the Western Association of Schools and Colleges (WASC). This accreditation was approved in 2016, with AAU becoming the first WASC-accredited university in Europe.

Courses at AAU were initially organised under the School of Business Administration, School of Humanities and Social Sciences, and School of Law. The university subsequently added a School of International Relations and Diplomacy (2006) and School of Journalism (2010). In late 2008, John H. Carey II, co-founder and lecturer at the school of law, died, and the AAU School of Law was renamed in his honour as the John H. Carey II School of Law.

Academics

The university offers a preparatory Certificate of Higher Education in Common Law (CertHE Common Law).

The university runs bachelor programs in Business Administration and International Relations with various possible specialisations, as well as other bachelor programs in: Humanities, Society and Culture; Politics and Society; Journalism and Communications; Visual Art Studies; and a Bachelor of Laws (LLB) using University of London International Programmes Courses. The university also runs several bachelor courses in conjunction with Kent State University, including Computer Science (B.A. or B.S.), B.B.A. Computer Information Systems, and B.S. Emerging Media and Technology with a minor in either User Experience or Web Development.

The university runs master's programs in Humanities, and International Relations and Diplomacy, as well as Master of Law (LLM) programs in International Intellectual Property Law, and Law and Development, using University of London International Programmes Courses.

The university offers a Master of Business Administration (MBA) in cooperation with Chapman University, California

AAU also offers various courses related to Czech culture, including:

 Czech and Slovak Politics
 Cities of Central Europe: Prague, Vienna and Budapest
 Literature of Prague
 Prague Art and Architecture
 Czech as a foreign language

Accreditation 
Most of AAU's  programs are accredited by the Czech Ministry of Education, Youth and Sports, except the Certificate of Higher Education in Common Law (CertHE Common Law), LLB, LLM, and the Chapman MBA program, which are offered in cooperation with international partners.

Anglo-American University is accredited by the WASC Senior College and University Commission (WSCUC), an American accrediting agency which evaluates public and private senior colleges and universities in the western part of the United States. The accreditation was granted in June 2016 for a period of six years. The accreditation was granted on the basis of the university having a sufficient level of compliance with WSCUC's 2013 Standards of Accreditation, and satisfactorily addressing the core commitments to Student Learning and Success, Quality and Improvement, and Institutional Integrity, Sustainability, and Accountability.

The MBA program offered in cooperation with Chapman University, California is globally accredited by the Association to Advance Collegiate Schools of Business AACSB. The Certificate of Higher Education in Common Law (CertHE Common Law) and the LLB and LLM programs are offered in cooperation with the University of London.

University facilities

Campus 
AAU’s main campus is located in the newly restored Thurn-Taxis Palace, a cultural monument dating to the 17th century, previously owned by the German Thurn und Taxis noble family and now under the ownership of the city of Prague. The premises consist of 16 classrooms, a computer lab, and a visual arts studio, along with a cafeteria, courtyard and student lounges.

University library 
AAU has a university library with a collection of 19,000 books, predominantly in English. AAU students, staff and faculty also have access to the collections held by the Institute of International Relations Prague, the Institute for Contemporary History, Academy of Sciences, and other libraries in Prague. The library also hosts music and spoken word performances, readings, and discussion groups.

Exhibition gallery 
AAU has an exhibition gallery name |art| SPACE, which displays photography, paintings, installations, and sculptures by faculty and students. |art| SPACE operates under the School of Humanities and Social Sciences and is also used to showcase coursework in digital photography, visual arts and other creative courses.

Scholarships 

AAU runs a system of merit-based scholarships, allowing exceptional students to study at the university for free, based on academic achievement as measured by a student's Grade Point Average (GPA).

Student life 
AAU's Student Council is an independent body that represents students' interests in university plans, policies, and procedures; secures student representation in university governance; elects one representative for the Academic Council; and organizes various student activities. The Student Council consists of 10 members, plus two exchange students and one external adviser each semester and/or academic year. Council members are elected by the students at the beginning of each semester.

Student clubs running at AAU include basketball club, chess club, cooking club, dance club, film club, football club, photography club, program board, a volunteering club called "Helpful Hands", and yoga club.

AAU's student body includes full-time, exchange and study abroad students of many different nationalities.

Lennon Wall
 Lennon Wall is AAU's student magazine, which takes its name from the John Lennon Wall, a monument to freedom of expression located near the university. The magazine describes itself as "a nonpartisan platform for aspiring reporters and future writers", independent from the university.

Sexual harassment allegations

An article published on A2larm.cz on 16 July 2018 detailed accusations from two former students that AAU had failed to properly enforce their sexual harassment policy and failed to protect their students. On 17 July 2018, AAU responded with a statement categorically denying the accusations, stating that an investigation into the allegations of sexual harassment was ongoing, as required by AAU's policy on disciplinary procedures. Members of AAU's staff and upper management took to Facebook to defend their position soon after the initial article was published, clashing with both students and readers on A2larm's page, as well as AAU's public account. On 18 July 2018, A2larm announced that they would continue to investigate after being contacted by both students and staff of AAU with additional allegations of abuse and harassment, but has not filed anything since the announcement.

On 20 July 2018 the AAU President issued a press release addressing both cases reported in the article and announced action that would be taken by AAU. AAU pledged to revise the existing procedures and also to re-establish the AAU sexual harassment task force.

In response to A2larm.cz's articles alleging sexual harassment at AAU, WSCUC, the university's American accreditation body, reviewed AAU's rules and procedures in response to a complaint filed by a third party. WSCUC reported a “structured and rigorous process for addressing complaints related to sexual harassment and misconduct”, and on 10 August 2018 confirmed that AAU meets WSCUC's standards.

Notable alumni
 Klára Poláčková - The first Czech woman to climb Mount Everest.
 Alexandra Udženija - Deputy Leader of the Civic Democratic Party (2014–present).
 Oz Karahan - Cypriot political activist, President of the Union of Cypriots.

References

External links 
Anglo-American University website
Per Curiam, Anglo-American University Law Review website

Educational institutions established in 1990
Educational institutions in Prague
Universities in the Czech Republic
1990 establishments in Czechoslovakia
Schools accredited by the Western Association of Schools and Colleges